Margo Leavin (1936–2021) was an American art dealer. She was born in New York, but spent her career in Los Angeles. In 1970, she opened the Margo Leavin Gallery in West Hollywood, CA, which she operated until it closed in 2013.

Career and reputation
Leavin was known for her wit, her relationships with her artists, and business savvy. The longevity of her career is a testament to these attributes. The Gallery closed in 2013 but it promoted itself as specializing in contemporary photography, sculpture, paintings and drawings.

Artist and art dealer Nicholas Wilder is quoted as saying about Leavin and her gallery, "She works very hard and it's run as a business. It's not a thing that's there for some lifestyle change or for a tax write-off or something. She's a very good dealer."

Margo Leavin Gallery
The Margo Leavin Gallery was a contemporary art gallery in Los Angeles, California, United States. The gallery was opened in 1970 by Leavin at what was then the studio of designer Tony Duquette. Leavin later expanded to adjacent buildings along the block, including a former post office, which served as an exhibition space. Wendy Brandow, who joined in 1976, became a partner in 1989.

While the gallery began with exhibitions of mostly editioned work, it grew to become renowned for its program of modern and contemporary art and its work with a wide variety of artists from emerging to established ones.

The gallery closed in 2013, after producing over 400 solo exhibitions. In 2015, it was announced that the Getty Research Institute would acquire the complete archives of the Margo Leavin Gallery. The gallery property was sold in May 2016 to movie producer Megan Ellison, daughter of billionaire Larry Ellison, for $40 million.

In June 2016, Leavin made a $20 million donation to the UCLA School of the Arts and Architecture to rebuild and expand its aging graduate art studio facilities in Culver City; the complex was renamed the UCLA Margo Leavin Graduate Art Studios.

Exhibitions
The following is a partial list:

Billy Al Bengston
Joe Goode
Ed Moses
John Chamberlain
Dan Flavin
Ellsworth Kelly
Lynda Benglis
Agnes Martin
Hannah Wilke
David Hockney
Sol LeWitt
Charles Gaines
Haim Steinbach
Albert Oehlen
Rudolf Stingel
Mel Kendrick
Sherrie Levine
Larry Johnson
Tony Oursler
Dan Graham
Alexis Smith
John Baldessari
Sarah Charlesworth
Roni Horn
Joseph Kosuth
William Leavitt
Stephen Prina
Allen Ruppersberg
Gary Simmons
Jeffrey Vallance
Christopher Williams

References

1936 births
2021 deaths
People from New York (state)
People from Los Angeles
American art dealers
Women art dealers
20th-century American businesswomen
20th-century American businesspeople
21st-century American businesswomen
21st-century American businesspeople